Svendborg–Nyborg Banen is a now-decommissioned railway between Svendborg and Nyborg. It opened June 1, 1897, and closed May 30, 1964.

Notes

Closed railway lines in Denmark
Railway lines opened in 1897
Railway lines closed in 1964